Elements 1989–1990 is a 1996 compilation of early recordings by Detroit techno musician Carl Craig, released under the pseudonyms Psyche and BFC. It was released on Craig's label Planet E Communications and reissued in 2013.

In 2011, Fact named it one of the 20 greatest ambient albums ever made.

Recording
The recordings comprise some of Craig's earliest music, including his first recording "Neurotic Behavior." Beginning his career in his bedroom, Craig worked with a borrowed 4-track recorder. 
Some of the tracks were recorded in the homes of Derrick May, Renaat Vandepapeliere (of R&S Records), and singer Sarah Gregory. These recordings were released on labels such as Transmat, Fragile, and Craig's own Retroactive imprint. The track "Elements" was released on the various artists compilation Techno 2: The Next Generation (1990).

Reception

The compilation showcases Craig's atmospheric, introspective approach to techno, a feel which Fact described as "tranquilised sci-fi." Critic Tony Marcus praised the compilation, labeling the recordings "narcoleptic, interior techno." AllMusic called the compilation "quintessential Detroit techno" which demonstrated "Craig's talents as producer even at this early point in his career." Critic John Bush called the recordings "seminal" and stated that they are "long pointed to as the birth of the second wave of Detroit techno."

Tracklist
All tracks by Carl Craig (tracks 1-5, 11 credited to Psyche; tracks 6-10, 12, 13 credited to BFC.) Tracks 1 and 7 edited by Anthony Shakir; track 3 features vocals by Sarah Gregory; track 5 mixed by Derrick May.

 "Elements" – 6:50
 "Neurotic Behavior" – 7:42
 "Crackdown" – 5:58 
 "From Beyond" – 5:43
 "Andromeda" – 4:55
 "Evolution" – 3:09
 "Galaxy" – 6:41
 "It's a Shame" – 5:39
 "Please Stand By" – 5:02
 "Chicken Noodle Soup" – 6:33
 "How the West Was Won" – 3:34
 "Sleep" – 5:11
 "D.Funk" – 5:16 (bonus track, 2013 reissue)

Personnel
Adapted from Discogs.
Carl Craig – producer, composer, liner notes
Anthony Shakir – edits (tracks 1 and 7)
Brendan M. Gillen – compilation, design
Abdul Haqq – cover artwork

References

1996 compilation albums
Carl Craig albums
Techno compilation albums